Francesca Di Lorenzo (born July 22, 1997) is an American tennis player.

She played collegiately for the Ohio State University. On May 29, 2017, Di Lorenzo and her partner Miho Kowase won the NCAA Women's Doubles Championship.

Personal life
Di Lorenzo was born in Pittsburgh, Pennsylvania but raised in Columbus, Ohio, after her family moved there when she was around the age of seven. Her parents, Carlo and Daniela Di Lorenzo, are Italian immigrants from Salerno.
  Carlo is a physician at Nationwide Children's Hospital in Columbus and Daniela teaches Italian at various colleges. Di Lorenzo attended New Albany High School in New Albany, Ohio.

She has three siblings, and Cristina, her oldest sister, also played tennis at the collegiate level at Xavier University and graduated in 2017. Mario, her oldest brother, also has an athletic background. He won an intramural championship in the inaugural season of wheelchair basketball at Ohio State University.

Di Lorenzo is fluent in Italian. As a child, she played both tennis and soccer.

Tennis career

Amateur years
Coming out of high school, Di Lorenzo was ranked as the nation's top tennis recruit. She committed to playing collegiate tennis at Ohio State University. In her final tournament as a junior, she reached the semifinals in both the girls' singles and doubles tournaments at the 2015 US Open.

As a freshman, Di Lorenzo began her season by winning the USTA/ITA National Indoor Intercollegiate Championship, claiming the Buckeyes' first national title in its program's history. She defeated Joana Eidukonytė in the championship match, and concluded the season with a 37–5 record, setting the program record for most victories in a season, and was named singles all-American.

During her sophomore year with the Buckeyes, Di Lorenzo went 37-2 in singles, equaling her school record from the previous year. She also finished the year as the top-ranked women's NCAA singles player. Di Lorenzo repeated as the USTA/ITA National Indoor Champion, beating Hayley Carter in the final. She capped off her sophomore season by winning the NCAA Women's Doubles Championship with her partner, Miho Kowase. This championship was the program's first NCAA in its history. For her accomplishments during the season, Di Lorenzo was named both singles and doubles all-American.

Di Lorenzo earned a wildcard into the qualifiers of the singles tournament at the 2017 US Open. There she also received a wild card for the main draw of the doubles tournament and made her Grand Slam debut, partnering with Allie Kiick.

Professional career
On December 18, 2017, Di Lorenzo announced that she would be leaving Ohio State to become a professional tennis player.

She made her Grand Slam singles debut at the 2018 US Open winning her section of the qualifying tournament with victories over Antonia Lottner, Verónica Cepede Royg, and Mona Barthel. She made it to the second round where she was defeated by No. 13 seed, Kiki Bertens.

Performance timeline

Only main-draw results in WTA Tour, Grand Slam tournaments, Fed Cup/Billie Jean King Cup and Olympic Games are included in win–loss records.

Singles
Current after the 2022 Tennis in the Land.

ITF Circuit finals

Singles: 6 (4 titles, 2 runner–ups)

Doubles: 9 (4 titles, 5 runner–ups)

References

External links
 
 
 Ohio State Buckeyes bio

1997 births
Living people
American female tennis players
Tennis players from Pittsburgh
American people of Italian descent
Tennis people from Ohio
Ohio State Buckeyes women's tennis players
College women's tennis players in the United States